Niek Kimmann (born 20 May 1996 in Lutten) is a Dutch BMX racing cyclist. Kimmann is the reigning Olympic Champion BMX Racing, a three-time World Champion, one-time European Champion, three-time Dutch Champion, and two-time World Cup Supercross winner. He is also a two-time junior World Champion.

Career
Kimmann, born in Lutten., started BMXing at age seven, after attending a classmate's BMX training. At age 15, he joined the Dutch National Team at the Olympic Training Center in Papendal.

During the 2014 UCI BMX World Championships, Kimmann won the Junior World Title in both racing and time trial. In August 2014, together with Wiebe Scholten, he won a bronze medal in the team boys event at the 2014 Summer Youth Olympics.

He started racing in Elite in 2015. At Papendal, he won his first World Cup race and at the UCI BMX World Championships in Zolder, Belgium, Kimmann became World Champion at age 19. One day earlier, he won a silver medal in time trial. Kimmann became the second Dutch BMX World Champion, after Robert de Wilde, who won in 1999. As a reward for this season, Kimmann was one of the three nominees for Dutch Sportsman of the year, which was eventually won by short track speed skater Sjinkie Knegt.

In 2016, Kimmann finished 2nd, behind Joris Daudet at World Championships in Medellín. A day earlier, he won the time trail, which meant he is the last World Champion in this discipline. At the 2016 Olympics he finished seventh. He fell in the quarter finals, injuring his ankle ligament and a metatarsal bone. He had to recover from his injuries between August 2016 and February 2017. The serious crash of his friend and fellow BMX-cyclist Jelle van Gorkom in January 2018 while the two were training made deep impact on him.

In 2018 Kimmann won the Supercross World Cup, with four wins - and had to withdraw from the 2018 UCI BMX World Championships due to cramps. A year later he won the 2019 European BMX Championships. and successfully defended the World Cup with the highest point total (1180pts) in history, after winning six out of ten races.

In early 2021 Kimmann left the Dutch National Team in Papendal for The UCI World Cycling Centre in Aigle. He is now coached by former World Champion Liam Phillips. A few days before the 2020 Olympics, Kimmann crashed into a track official during a training lap around the BMX track, which resulted in a small fracture in his kneecap. On 30 July he won the Men's BMX gold medal starting from lane 8, ahead of Kye Whyte and Carlos Ramírez (BMX rider). After the Olympics he has confirmed that he'll continue BMX racing, but he doesn't rule out the possibility of joining the Dutch Track cycling team in the future.

Personal
His younger brother, Justin Kimmann, is also a BMX rider and finished 8th in the Junior World Championships 2016.

Trivia
 The Kimmann family has an indoor BMX track in a warehouse at their farm, which they use for training and shooting Youtube video's.
 During the Covid19 quarantine period, Kimmann set the 'Garden World Hour Record' in his backyard with a distance of 20.1 km, beating GCN's 16.3 km.
 In the run-up to the 2020 Olympics, Kimmann and his partner Samsung developed FastFrame. A regular Meybo BMX-bicyle with built-in sensors. These sensors give real-time information to his coaches.
 After his gold Olympic medal, Kimmann received a royal insignia, which made him Knight Order of Orange-Nassau

References

External links
 
 
 
 
 
 

1996 births
Living people
BMX riders
Dutch male cyclists
Olympic cyclists of the Netherlands
Olympic gold medalists for the Netherlands
Olympic medalists in cycling
Cyclists at the 2014 Summer Youth Olympics
Cyclists at the 2016 Summer Olympics
Cyclists at the 2020 Summer Olympics
Medalists at the 2020 Summer Olympics
UCI BMX World Champions (elite men)
People from Hardenberg
Cyclists from Overijssel
20th-century Dutch people
21st-century Dutch people